Krell may refer to:

 Krell (surname)
 Krell, an extinct race of aliens in the 1956 science fiction film Forbidden Planet
 Krell Industries, manufacturer of audio systems
 Krell Institute
 Krell Hill, a peak in Washington State
 Krell music, a niche subgenre of generative music